Belle Plain College, established in 1881, was a short-lived college located in the now defunct town of Belle Plain, Texas. The college was established by the Northwest Conference of the Methodist Church.

History
John Day donated  of land to the school, located in Belle Plain. In its beginnings local citizens donated generously to the institution. During its first year of existence, 1881–82, it operated in conjunction with the Belle Plain public school system. Franklin Wesley Chatfield served as Belle Plain College (BPC) president during most of its inaugural year. In the spring of 1882 the state awarded BPC a charter and Rev. J.T.L. Annis served as president of the college for the next two years. During his tenure enrollment increased to 122.

Other presidents of BPC include: John W. McIllhenny (1884–85), C. M. Virdel (1885-87), and I.M. Onins (1887–92).

Curriculum and campus
From its inception the college boasted of its music program. By the end of the 1880s the school had fifteen pianos, a brass band, and an orchestra. Though the campus comprised two buildings by 1885 the entire school had been mortgaged to pay for classroom furnishings and instruments. The school's only funding came from the local school district, a fact which hastened its demise.

Upon founding, the school had a girl's dormitory constructed. At the college's height over 300 people were enrolled and in 1885 a three-story stone structure was built at the site. BPC had a military branch of its school in the small town of Belle Plain. The students there were required to wear blue and gray uniforms.

The end of Belle Plain College
When the railroad skipped over Belle Plain in favor of Baird the latter quickly gained favor and became the county seat of Callahan County in 1883. The population began to decline as a result. A couple years of bad weather depleted the college's already empty coffers. Judge I.M. Onins took over the school and its debts in 1887. The mortgage company foreclosed on the property in 1889, though they allowed it to operate until Onins' 1892 death. Today the ruins of the college buildings remain.

External links
Belle Plain College Photo tour: Drew Timmons Photography

Notes

Defunct private universities and colleges in Texas
Educational institutions established in 1881
Educational institutions disestablished in 1892
1881 establishments in Texas
1892 disestablishments in Texas
Education in Callahan County, Texas